Spiking neural networks (SNNs) are artificial neural networks that more closely mimic natural neural networks. In addition to neuronal and synaptic state, SNNs incorporate the concept of time into their operating model. The idea is that neurons in the SNN do not transmit information at each propagation cycle (as it happens with typical multi-layer perceptron networks), but rather transmit information only when a membrane potential – an intrinsic quality of the neuron related to its membrane electrical charge – reaches a specific value, called the threshold. When the membrane potential reaches the threshold, the neuron fires, and generates a signal that travels to other neurons which, in turn, increase or decrease their potentials in response to this signal. A neuron model  that fires at the moment of threshold crossing is also called a spiking neuron model.

The most prominent spiking neuron model is the leaky integrate-and-fire model. In the integrate-and-fire model, the momentary activation level (modeled as a differential equation) is normally considered to be the neuron's state, with incoming spikes pushing this value higher or lower, until the state eventually either decays or  - if the firing threshold is reached - the neuron fires. After firing the state variable is reset to a lower value.

Various decoding methods exist for interpreting the outgoing spike train as a real-value number, relying on either the frequency of spikes (rate-code), the time-to-first-spike after stimulation, or the interval between spikes.

History

Many multi-layer artificial neural networks are fully connected, receiving input from every neuron in the previous layer and signalling every neuron in the subsequent layer. Although these networks have achieved breakthroughs in many fields, they are biologically inaccurate and do not mimic the operation mechanism of neurons in the brain of a living thing.

The biologically inspired Hodgkin–Huxley model of a spiking neuron was proposed  in 1952. This model describes how action potentials are initiated and propagated. Communication between neurons, which requires the exchange of chemical neurotransmitters in the synaptic gap, is described in various models, such as the integrate-and-fire model, FitzHugh–Nagumo model (1961–1962), and Hindmarsh–Rose model (1984). The leaky integrate-and-fire model (or a derivative) is commonly used as it is easier to compute than the Hodgkin–Huxley model.

Underpinnings 

Information in the brain is represented as action potentials (neuron spikes), which may be grouped into spike trains or even coordinated waves of brain activity. A fundamental question of neuroscience is to determine whether neurons communicate by a rate or temporal code. Temporal coding suggests that a single spiking neuron can replace hundreds of hidden units on a sigmoidal neural net.

An SNN computes in the continuous rather than the discrete domain. The idea is that neurons may not test for activation in every iteration of propagation (as is the case in a typical multilayer perceptron network), but only when their membrane potentials reach a certain value. When a neuron is activated, it produces a signal that is passed to connected neurons, raising or lowering their membrane potential.

In a spiking neural network, a neuron's current state is defined as its membrane potential (possibly modeled as a differential equation). An input pulse causes the membrane potential to rise for a period of time and then gradually decline. Encoding schemes have been constructed to interpret these pulse sequences as a number, taking into account both pulse frequency and pulse interval. A neural network model based on pulse generation time can be established. Using the exact time of pulse occurrence, a neural network can employ more information and offer better computing properties.

The SNN approach produces a continuous output instead of the binary output of traditional ANNs. Pulse trains are not easily interpretable, hence the need for encoding schemes as above. However, a pulse train representation may be more suited for processing spatiotemporal data (or continual real-world sensory data classification). SNNs consider space by connecting neurons only to nearby neurons so that they process input blocks separately (similar to CNN using filters). They consider time by encoding information as pulse trains so as not to lose information in a binary encoding. This avoids the additional complexity of a recurrent neural network (RNN). It turns out that impulse neurons are more powerful computational units than traditional artificial neurons.

SNNs are theoretically more powerful than second-generation networks[term undefined: what are 2nd-gen networks?]; however, SNN training issues and hardware requirements limit their use. Although unsupervised biologically inspired learning methods are available such as Hebbian learning and STDP, no effective supervised training method is suitable for SNNs that can provide better performance than second-generation networks. Spike-based activation of SNNs is not differentiable thus making it hard to develop gradient descent based training methods to perform error backpropagation, though a few recent algorithms such as NormAD and multilayer NormAD have demonstrated good training performance through suitable approximation of the gradient of spike based activation.

SNNs have much larger computational costs for simulating realistic neural models than traditional ANNs.

Pulse-coupled neural networks (PCNN) are often confused with SNNs. A PCNN can be seen as a kind of SNN.

Currently there are a few challenges when using SNNs that researchers are actively working on. The first challenge concerns the nondifferentiability of the spiking nonlinearity. The expressions for both the forward- and backward-learning methods contain the derivative of the neural activation function which is non-differentiable because neuron's output is either 1 when it spikes, and 0 otherwise. This all-or-nothing behavior of the binary spiking nonlinearity stops gradients from “flowing” and makes LIF neurons unsuitable for gradient-based optimization. The second challenge concerns the implementation of the optimization algorithm itself. Standard BP can be expensive in terms of computation, memory, and communication and may be poorly suited to the constraints dictated by the hardware that implements it (e.g., a computer, brain, or neuromorphic device). Regarding the first challenge there are several approached in order to overcome it. A few of them are:

 resorting to entirely biologically inspired local learning rules for the hidden units
 translating conventionally trained “rate-based” NNs to SNNs
 smoothing the network model to be continuously differentiable
 defining an SG (Surogate Gradient) as a continuous relaxation of the real gradients

Applications

SNNs can in principle apply to the same applications as traditional ANNs. In addition, SNNs can model the central nervous system of biological organisms, such as an insect seeking food without prior knowledge of the environment. Due to their relative realism, they can be used to study the operation of biological neural circuits. Starting with a hypothesis about the topology of a biological neuronal circuit and its function, recordings of this circuit can be compared to the output of the corresponding SNN, evaluating the plausibility of the hypothesis. However, there is a lack of effective training mechanisms for SNNs, which can be inhibitory for some applications, including computer vision tasks.

As of 2019 SNNs lag behind ANNs in terms of accuracy, but the gap is decreasing, and has vanished on some tasks.

When using SNNs for image based data we need to convert static images into binary spike trains coding. Types of encodings:

 Temporal coding generates one spike per neuron in which spike latency is inversely proportional to the pixel intensity. 
 Rate coding converts pixel intensity into a spike train where the number of spikes is proportional to the pixel intensity.
 Direct coding uses a trainable layer to generate float value for each time-step. We have a learnable layer which converts each pixel at certain time step in float number and then threshold is used on the generated floating numbers to see if they will be 1 or 0.
 Phase coding encodes temporal information into spike patterns based on a global oscillator.
 Burst coding transmits the burst of spikes in a small-time duration, increasing the reliability of synaptic communication between neurons.

Software

A diverse range of application software can simulate SNNs. This software can be classified according to its uses:

SNN simulation 
 These simulate complex neural models with a high level of detail and accuracy. Large networks usually require lengthy processing. Candidates include:

 Brian – developed by Romain Brette and Dan Goodman at the École Normale Supérieure;
 GENESIS (the GEneral NEural SImulation System) – developed in James Bower's laboratory at Caltech;
 NEST – developed by the NEST Initiative;
 NEURON – mainly developed by Michael Hines, John W. Moore and Ted Carnevale in Yale University and Duke University;

Hardware 

Future neuromorphic architectures will comprise billions of such nanosynapses, which require a clear understanding of the physical mechanisms responsible for plasticity. Experimental systems based on ferroelectric tunnel junctions have been used to show that STDP can be harnessed from heterogeneous polarization switching. Through combined scanning probe imaging, electrical transport and atomic-scale molecular dynamics, conductance variations can be modelled by nucleation-dominated reversal of domains. Simulations show that arrays of ferroelectric nanosynapses can autonomously learn to recognize patterns in a predictable way, opening the path towards unsupervised learning.

Akida is a completely digital event-based neural processing device with 1.2 million artificial neurons and 10 billion artificial synapses developed by BrainChip. Utilizing event-based possessing, it analyzes essential inputs at specific points. Results are stored in the on-chip memory units.
Neurogrid is a board that can simulate spiking neural networks directly in hardware. (Stanford University)
SpiNNaker (Spiking Neural Network Architecture) uses ARM processors as the building blocks of a massively parallel computing platform based on a six-layer thalamocortical model. (University of Manchester) The SpiNNaker system is based on numerical models running in real time on custom digital multicore chips using the ARM architecture. It provides custom digital chips, each with eighteen cores and a shared local 128 Mbyte RAM, with a total of over 1,000,000 cores. A single chip can simulate 16,000 neurons with eight million plastic synapses running in real time.
TrueNorth is a processor that contains 5.4 billion transistors that consumes only 70 milliwatts; most processors in personal computers contain about 1.4 billion transistors and require 35 watts or more. IBM refers to the design principle behind TrueNorth as neuromorphic computing. Its primary purpose is pattern recognition. While critics say the chip isn't powerful enough, its supporters point out that this is only the first generation, and the capabilities of improved iterations will become clear. (IBM)

Benchmarks 
Classification capabilities of spiking networks trained according to unsupervised learning methods have been tested on the common benchmark datasets, such as, Iris, Wisconsin Breast Cancer or Statlog Landsat dataset. Various approaches to information encoding and network design have been used. For example, a 2-layer feedforward network for data clustering and classification. Based on the idea proposed in Hopfield (1995) the authors implemented models of local receptive fields combining the properties of radial basis functions (RBF) and spiking neurons to convert input signals (classified data) having a floating-point representation into a spiking representation.

See also 

CoDi
Cognitive architecture
Cognitive map
Cognitive computer
Computational neuroscience
Neural coding
Neural correlate
Neural decoding
Neuroethology
Neuroinformatics
Models of neural computation
Motion perception
Systems neuroscience

References

Further reading 
 

Computational statistics
Artificial neural networks
Articles containing video clips
Computational neuroscience